NOAA-3, also known as ITOS-F was a weather satellite operated by the National Oceanic and Atmospheric Administration (NOAA). It was part of a series of satellites called ITOS, or improved TIROS. It was deactivated by NOAA in August 1976.

References

1973 in spaceflight
Weather satellites of the United States
Spacecraft launched by Delta rockets
Spacecraft launched in 1973

External links
 NOAA-3 Satellite Position